Iosif Slivăț (born 19 February 1915) was a Romanian football defender.

International career
Iosif Slivăț played three friendly games at international level for Romania, making his debut in a friendly which ended with a 1–0 loss against Italy.

Honours
Ripensia Timișoara
Divizia A: 1934–35
Cupa României runner-up: 1934–35
Rapid București
Cupa României: 1939–40, 1940–41
UTA Arad
Divizia A: 1946–47, 1947–48

Notes

References

External links
Iosif Slivăț at Labtof.ro

1915 births
Romanian footballers
Romania international footballers
Association football defenders
Liga I players
Liga II players
FC Ripensia Timișoara players
FC Rapid București players
FC Olimpia Satu Mare players
FC UTA Arad players
Romanian expatriate footballers
Expatriate footballers in Hungary
Expatriate sportspeople in Hungary
Romanian expatriates in Hungary
Romanian expatriate sportspeople in Hungary
Year of death missing